Twat is a slang word for the human vulva, also used as a derogatory epithet for a foolish person.

Twat or Tuat may also refer to:

 Traveling-wave amplifier tube, in electronics
 Tuat, a people in the north of Algeria
 Tuat language
 Tokyo University of Agriculture and Technology
 Task Unit Anti Terrorism of 1st Carabinieri Paratroopers Regiment "Tuscania"

See also
 Duat, the underworld in Egyptian mythology
 Taweret, the Egyptian goddess of childbirth and fertility
 Twatt (disambiguation)